Fritz Sperling (born 1 August 1945) is an Austrian bobsledder who competed from the early 1970s to the early 1980s. He won two medals in the four-man event at the FIBT World Championships with a silver in 1973 and a bronze in 1974.

Competing in three Winter Olympics, Sperling earned his best finish of fourth in the two-man event at Innsbruck in 1976.

References

External links
Bobsleigh four-man world championship medalists since 1930
Wallenchinsky, David (1984). "Bobsled". In The Complete Book of the Olympics: 1896 - 1980. New York: Penguin Books. pp. 559, 561-2.

1945 births
Living people
Austrian male bobsledders
Bobsledders at the 1972 Winter Olympics
Bobsledders at the 1976 Winter Olympics
Bobsledders at the 1980 Winter Olympics
Olympic bobsledders of Austria